Hexagone Balard is the headquarters of the French Armed Forces and the Ministry of the Armed Forces. Inaugurated in 2015, more than 9,300 personnel from the French Army, French Navy, French Air and Space Force and Direction générale de l'armement have moved into this  165,000 m2 floorspace white-opaque-glass-fronted building, on 41 acres, from previously separate headquarters for each service branch.  It cost 4.2 billion euro.

History 
In 2011, the French Government awarded the  Opale-Défense consortium a contract, for financing, designing, constructing, operating, and maintaining the complex for thirty years. Agence Nicolas Michelin & Associés designed the seven-story command and control center, on a former army air base near the Balard (Paris Métro) in the 15th arrondissement.

As a military base, the command of the site is handed over to the Major General of the Defence Staff, deputy to the Chief of the Defence Staff.

Personnel transferred from historical buildings in central Paris to this site in the south of the city, excepting the Defence Minister who remains in central Paris. Half of the complex is renovation, including an old navy building, designed in 1934 by Gustave and Auguste Perret. The complex boasts a real drawbridge, interior gardens, missile-strike-resisant walls and an underground operational room.

Appearance
Images of the complex (as well as all military-related and sensitive government buildings in France) can't be seen on Bing Maps, Google Maps, Google Earth, and Google Street View for national security reasons, yet Here WeGo, and Yandex Maps do not censor the satellite image.

Only the faceted roof is visible from the elevated ring road. It has the largest solar panel roof in Paris.

Headquarters 
The complex serves as the primary headquarters of the Armed Forces. As such, the entirety of the command structure of the military is housed here:
 Chief of the Defence Staff
  Major General of the Defence Staff
 Chief of Staff of the Army
 Major General of the Army
 Chief of Staff of the Navy
 Major General of the Navy
 Chief of Staff of the Air and Space Force
 Major General of the Air and Space Force

However, the civil administration of the Ministry and the Minister are still headquartered at the Hôtel de Brienne in the 7th arrondissement of Paris.

References

External links
 
 

Military facilities in Paris
Military headquarters in France
Buildings and structures in Paris
Government buildings completed in 2015
2015 establishments in Paris
Joint military headquarters
21st-century architecture in France